Yé-yé (yeyé in Spanish) was a style of pop music that emerged in Western-Southern Europe in the early 1960s. The French term "yé-yé" was derived from the English "yeah! yeah!", popularized by British beat music bands such as the Beatles. The style expanded worldwide as the result of the success of figures such as French singer-songwriters Sylvie Vartan, Serge Gainsbourg and Françoise Hardy. Yé-yé was a particular form of counterculture that derived most of its inspiration from British and American rock and roll. Additional stylistic elements of yé-yé song composition include baroque, exotica, pop, jazz and the French chanson.

History
The  movement had its origins in the radio program  (loosely translated as "hello mates" or "hello pals"), created by Jean Frydman and hosted by Daniel Filipacchi and Frank Ténot, which first aired in December 1959. The phrase "Salut les copains" dates back to the title of a 1957 song by Gilbert Bécaud and Pierre Delanoë, who themselves had little regard for the yé-yé music that the radio show typically featured. The program became an immediate success, and one of its sections, "Le chouchou de la semaine" ("This Week's Sweetheart"), became the starting point for most yé-yé singers. Any song that was presented as a chouchou went straight to the top places in the charts. The Salut les copains phenomenon continued with a magazine of the same name that was first published in 1962 in France, with German, Spanish, and Italian ("Ciao Amici") editions following shortly afterward.
"Radios were practicing a real hype, much more than today. We, the singers, were much, much less numerous than today – and there were fewer radios. It was also the heyday of Salut les copains, and the press played an extremely important role, it could promote beginners. I remember being on the front page of Paris Match very quickly, without being very well known or doing anything special for that; this would no longer be possible nowadays. In fact, in the 1960s, we saw the advent of the mass media. At the same time, fashion had assumed a considerable importance, which it had never before had. Singers like me became emblems of fashion, in addition to chanson, which helped to maintain notoriety."

—Françoise Hardy, Télérama, 2012.

Françoise Hardy performed on Mireille Hartuch's  television show in February 1962 (a year before The Beatles recorded "She Loves You"), singing "", which began with "Yeah yeah yeah yeah". After she finished, Hartuch remarked on the "yé yé" lyrics and asked her what they meant.

Yé-yé girls

Yé-yé music was a mostly continental European phenomenon and usually featured young female singers. France Gall, for example, was only sixteen years of age when she released her first album and seventeen when she won the Eurovision Song Contest (for Luxembourg) singing
the prototype bubblegum song "Poupée de cire, poupée de son". Another later hit by Gall included "Laisse tomber les filles", a cover version of which by April March called "Chick Habit" appeared in Quentin Tarantino's 2007 film Death Proof.

Yé-yé songs had innocent themes such as that of Françoise Hardy's "Tous les garçons et les filles" ("All the guys and girls my age know how it feels to be happy, but I am lonely. When will I know how it feels to have someone?").

France had a large market for the consumption of French-language songs at the time. Unlike other European nations such as West Germany, the French were more willing to support artists from their own country, singing in their native tongue. Some of the early French artists who were dabbling in rock and roll and similar genres, such as Johnny Hallyday, admit that they were creating an imitation of English-language rock music. Yé-yé helped assimilate that music in a unique, French way, and with the popularity of Salut les copains, the public began to see stars such as France Gall emerge.

The singers were sexualized in a deliberately contrived naïve manner. Composer and singer/songwriter Serge Gainsbourg once called Gall the French Lolita and, wanting to exploit her innocence, composed for her the double-entendre song "Les sucettes" ("Lollipops"): "Annie loves lollipops, aniseed lollipops, when the sweet liquid runs down Annie's throat, she is in paradise." The lyrics of the song are blatantly phallic, and the music video essentially features a group of dancing penises.

Sylvie Vartan married rock star Johnny Hallyday in 1965 and toured in America and Asia, but she remained a yé-yé at heart, and as late as 1968 she recorded the song "Jolie poupée" ("Pretty Doll"), about a girl who regrets having abandoned her doll after growing up.

Sheila portrayed the image of a well-behaved young girl. Her first hit was "L'école est finie" ("School is over") in 1962.

In 1967, teen yé-yé singer Jacqueline Taïeb won the Best Newcomer award in Cannes at the Midem awards for her hit single "7 heures du matin".

Other significant girl singers of the era include teen TV star Christine Delaroche, Jocelyne, Zouzou, Evy, Cosette (Dominique Cozette) and Annie Philippe. Some girl groups emerged, such as Les Parisiennes, influenced by acts like the Shangri-Las.

Although originating in France, the yé-yé movement extended over Western Europe. Italian singer Mina became her country's first female rock-and-roll singer in 1959. In the following few years, she moved to middle-of-the-road girl pop. After her scandalous relationship and pregnancy with a married actor in 1963, Mina developed her image into that of a grown-up "bad girl". An example of her style may be found in the lyrics of the song "Ta-ra-ta-ta": "The way you smoke, you are irresistible to me, you look like a real man." By contrast, her compatriot Rita Pavone cast the image of a typical teenage yé-yé girl; for example, the lyrics of her 1964 hit "Cuore" complained how love made the protagonist suffer.

In Italy, the yé-yé wave ended around 1967, vanishing under the emergence of British blues rock, pop and psychedelia.
Parisian-born singer Catherine Spaak had a massive success in Italy with a style very close to that of Françoise Hardy.
Other significant Italian yé-yé girls include Mari Marabini, Carmen Villani, Anna Identici and the girl groups Le Amiche, Le Snobs and Sonia e le Sorelle.

British singer Sandie Shaw recorded Puppet on a String in 1967 and won the Eurovision Song Contest 1967, the first for the United Kingdom.

In Spain, yé-yé music was at first considered to be incompatible with Catholicism, in then Francoist Spain. However, this did not stop the yé-yé culture from spreading, although a bit later than in the rest of Europe; in 1968 Spanish yé-yé girl Massiel won the Eurovision song contest with "La, la, la", while the sweet, naïve-looking singer Karina enjoyed success as the Spanish yé-yé queen with her hits "En un mundo nuevo" and "El baúl de los recuerdos".
In the 1965 film Historias de la televisión, Concha Velasco's character, who competes against a yé-yé girl, sings La chica ye-ye ("The Yé-yé Girl").
The song became a hit, and Velasco is often remembered as, of course, la chica yeyé.

Yé-yé grew very popular in Japan and formed the origins of Shibuya-kei and Japanese idol music. Gall recorded a Japanese version of "Poupée de cire, poupée de son". The film Cherchez l'idole, featuring Johnny Hallyday, has seen a Japanese DVD release. The yé-yé vocal group Les Surfs appear in the film performing their hit song "Ca n'a pas d'importance".

At the end of the 1970s, there was a brief but successful yé-yé recurrence in France, spreading across the charts of Western Europe with electro-pop-influenced acts such as Plastic Bertrand, Lio and Elli et Jacno and,
in a harder rock vein, Ici Paris and Les Calamités (a subgenre dubbed "Yé-yé punk" by Les Wampas leader Didier Wampas). Lio had a string of hits during 1980, the most famous of which was "Amoureux Solitaires". This new brand of yé-yé, although short-lived, echoed the synthesizer-driven sound that had surfaced recently with new wave music.

Because female singers dominated the yé-yé scene, the movement is occasionally seen as a feminist statement, even though the songwriters behind the singers were men, and the songs often infantilized their singers (as previously discussed in this article).  That said, in lieu of a desperate and codependent voice, a fun and flirtatious point of view was often depicted. Gall's 1966 song "Baby Pop," for example, adopts a playful attitude toward the traditional institution of marriage, singing "On your wedding night, it'll be too late to regret it."

Yé-yé boys 
While the yé-yé movement was led by female singers, it was not an exclusively female movement. The yé-yé masterminds (such as Serge Gainsbourg, who wrote several hits for France Gall, Petula Clark and Brigitte Bardot, but was considerably older and came from a jazz background) were distinct from the actual yé-yé singers. Michel Polnareff, for example, played the tormented, hopeless lover in songs such as "Love Me Please Love Me", while Jacques Dutronc claimed to have seduced Santa Claus's daughter in "La Fille du Père Noël". Among the more popular male yé-yé singers was Claude François, notable for songs such as "Belles, Belles, Belles", a French-language adaptation of the Everly Brothers' and Eddie Hodges' "(Girls, Girls, Girls) Made to Love". In Portugal, the first yé-yé bands appeared in Coimbra in 1956, most notably Os Babies, led by José Cid. Other Portuguese bands followed afterward, including Os Conchas, Os Ekos, Os Sheiks, Os Celtas, Conjunto Académico João Paulo, Os Demónios Negros and singers such as Daniel Bacelar.

Impact of yé-yé 
The yé-yé movement maintains a particular prevalence in the music world because of its swinging, catchy rhythms and carefree lyrics. Unlike the confining strictures of society, yé-yé promoted a refreshing and invigorating newness and inevitably promoted a sort of sexual rebellion that greatly characterized the 1960s. Dalida's 1960 song "Itsi bitsi, petit bikini", previously recorded as "Itsy Bitsy Teenie Weenie Yellow Polkadot Bikini" by Brian Hyland, perfectly illustrated yé-yé's newfound nonchalance and release from prudish subject matter. The song, "...which denotes a nonchalant and undisciplined listening," is about a girl afraid to reveal her bikini to fellow beachgoers, and it represents the shocking aspect of the lax attitude toward an increased sexuality, especially for women, as bikinis were previously considered scandalous. Similarly, yé-yé contributed to the creation of a youth culture within a postwar France that expressed a certain playfulness and carefree perspective on life. Sociologist and philosopher Edgar Morin commented on the rise and popularity of yé-yé music and culture, "...seeing in yé-yé's frantic, syncopated rhythms simultaneously a commodified music...of adult consumption, and a festive, playful hedonism..." As it was for any postwar youth culture, yé-yé acted as a creative outlet that aided in defining an era as well as an identity for Europe, specifically France. The archetype of la parisienne, exuding an exotic charm and magnetic appeal, was greatly defined by the influence of the numerous yé-yé girls within the scene and created an indelible mark in the worlds of both fashion and style. The "...escapist, ironic..." facets of yé-yé enticed thousands of listeners, promoting a gaiety and glamour that intertwined with the sexual freedom and modernity of the Swinging Sixties.

In popular culture
A 1964 Life article titled "Hooray for the Yé-Yé Girls" attempted to introduce three popular female yé-yé singers, Sylvie Vartan, Sheila and Françoise Hardy, to American readers. It erroneously implies that the term "yé-yé" is derived from the shouts of the crowds watching the performers.
In her 1964 essay "Notes on "Camp"", Susan Sontag cited yé-yé as an example of an entire genre being annexed by the camp sensibility.
 The Italian title of the 1966 film Out of Sight was 007 1/2 agente per forza contro gli assassini dello yé yé.
 American singer April March brought back the yé-yé sound when she released the EP Chick Habit, a rewrite of the famous Serge Gainsbourg song "Laisse tomber les filles," and also recorded many other yé-yé-inspired songs both in the US and France.
 French-American singer Céline Dijon (an obviously parodic pseudonym) with the groups Les Sans-Culottes and Nous non plus (2002-2010).
 In 2012, French-Canadian actress Jessica Paré performed a version of "Zou Bisou Bisou" (originally sung by Gillian Hills) in the fifth-season premiere of the American television series Mad Men. Reaction to the song was such that the AMC network released the song as a single in digital download and vinyl formats.
 Swedish band Therion released a cover album called Les Fleurs du Mal, composed mostly of symphonic metal versions of yé-yé songs.
 The group Doing Time released the album "I Was a Ye-Ye Girl" in 2001.

See also
 List of yé-yé singers

References

External links
 Teppaz and co: French website about sixties yé-yé singers
 Radio Yé-Yé!: A radio station playing yeye songs from the sixties.
 Les Surfs History, Biography, Photos, Videos, Links to merchandise and much more

 
French styles of music